The Virtual EP is an EP from Ten Second Epic. It was released October 14, 2008 on Black Box Recordings. It is only available for download on the iTunes Store. The songs "Life Times" and "Yours to Lose" were later released on Hometown. This EP also features new versions of two songs from their previous album Count Yourself In.

Track listing

References

2008 EPs